The Principality of Koknese (Russian: Кукейнос (Kukeinos), German: Kokenhusen, Latin:Kukonouyes) was a small vassal state  of  the Principality of Polotsk on the right bank of the Daugava River in ancient Livonia (modern Latvia) during the Middle Ages.

History
At the beginning of the 13th century, when the crusading Livonian Brothers of the Sword led by bishop Albert of Riga began to occupy the shores of the Gulf of Riga, the Eastern Orthodox prince Vetseke ruled the fortress of Koknese some 100 km upstream.

According to old sources, Vetseke gave half of his land to Albert of Riga in 1205 in return for protection against the Duchy of Samogitia. During one of their raids he was captured by the Livonians but was released by order of the bishop. When the bishop left for Germany Vetseke rebelled, killed all the Germans in Koknese and called on Polotsk for support. The bishop and his army quickly returned and Vetseke burned his castle and fled to Novgorod. By 1209 Koknese had been taken over by the Brothers of the Sword and the sovereignty of Polotsk was finally revoked in 1215. The knights controlled the town until it was transferred to the Bishopric of Riga in 1238.

Archaeological excavations in Koknese showed that town in the 13th century was inhabited mainly by Latgalians and Selonians with a very small Slavic minority.

See also
Koknese Castle

References

External links
Генрих Латвийский Хроника Ливонии (Russian)
Генрих Латвийский Хроника Ливонии (Russian)

1206 disestablishments
Historical regions in Latvia
Livonian Crusade
States and territories established in the 1180s
Former principalities
Subdivisions of Kievan Rus'